"Negation" is a poem from Wallace Stevens's first book
of poetry,  Harmonium. It
was first published in 1918, so it is in the public
domain.

This poem was Section VII of the poem—sequence "Lettres d'un Soldat"
(1918). It was extracted as "Negation" for inclusion in the second
edition of Harmonium. It may reflect Stevens's reading of 
Thus Spoke Zarathustra, according to Bates. The poem's image of God as
bungling potter recalls Zarathustra's dialogue with the last pope, in
which God is similarly characterized.

Another Harmonium poem that clearly reflects Stevens's reading of Nietzsche 
is "The Surprises of the Superhuman", which was also extracted from
"Lettres d'un Soldat" for inclusion in the second edition.

The poem is notable for its arch wit and the anti-poetical salutation, "Hi!", 
rather than as a solution to the problem of evil.

Notes

References 

 Bates, Milton J. 1985: University of California Press.

External links

1918 poems
American poems
Poetry by Wallace Stevens